A detached signature is a type of digital signature that is kept separate from its signed data, as opposed to bundled together into a single file.

See also 
 XML Signature

References 
 
 

Public-key cryptography